Teinostoma is a genus of minute sea snails, marine gastropod mollusks or micromollusks in the family Teinostomatidae.

This genus used to be placed within the family Skeneidae or family Tornidae(as subfamily Teinostomatinae Cossmann, 1917)

Shell description
The shells of species in this genus are usually white and glossy, are transparent when fresh, and are only a few millimeters in maximum size.

Species
This genus includes the following species:

 Teinostoma abditum Rolán, Rubio & Ryall, 2000
 Teinostoma abnorme E. A. Smith, 1890
 Teinostoma africanum (E. A. Smith, 1904)
 Teinostoma aloysii Selli, 1974
 Teinostoma altum Pilsbry, 1953
 Teinostoma americanum Pilsbry & Olsson, 1945
 Teinostoma amplectans Carpenter, 1857
 Teinostoma anastomosis Rubio, Rolán & Lee, 2011
 Teinostoma atomaria (A. Adams, 1861)
 Teinostoma avunculus Pilsbry, 1953
 Teinostoma azoricum (Dautzenberg & Fischer H., 1896)
 Teinostoma baldingeri Rubio, Fernández-Garcés & Rolán, 2011
 Teinostoma bibbianum Dall, 1919
 Teinostoma biscaynense Pilsbry & McGinty, 1945
 Teinostoma brankovitsi Rubio, Rolán, Worsaae, Martínez & Gonzalez, 2016
 Teinostoma callosum Thiele, 1925
 Teinostoma cansadoi Adam & Knudsen, 1969
 Teinostoma carbonnieri Jousseaume, 1881
 Teinostoma carinicallus Pilsbry & McGinty, 1946
 Teinostoma cecinella Dall, 1919
 Teinostoma cienfuegosense Rubio, Fernández-Garcés & Rolán, 2011
 Teinostoma circularis Talavera, 1975
 Teinostoma ciskae Faber, 1995
 Teinostoma cocolitoris Pilsbry & McGinty, 1945
 † Teinostoma complanatum Deshayes, 1864 
 Teinostoma concavaxis Pilsbry & Olsson, 1945
 Teinostoma concentricum A. Adams, 1863
 Teinostoma deschampsi Jousseaume, 1881
 Teinostoma diotrephes (Melvill, 1910)
 Teinostoma ecuadorianum Pilsbry & Olsson, 1941
 † Teinostoma elegans Deshayes, 1864 
 Teinostoma esmeralda Pilsbry & Olsson, 1945
 Teinostoma expansum Rubio, Fernández-Garcés & Rolán, 2011
 Teinostoma fernandesi Rubio & Rolán, 1991
 Teinostoma funiculatum Rubio & Rolán, 1991
 † Teinostoma gallegosi Jordan, 1936
 Teinostoma goniogyrus Pilsbry & McGinty, 1945
 Teinostoma helicinum Rubio, Fernández-Garcés & Rolán, 2011
 Teinostoma hemphilli Strong & Hertlein, 1939
 Teinostoma herbertianum Hertlein & Strong, 1951
 † Teinostoma hosdenacense Cossmann, 1888 
 Teinostoma hyalinum Thiele, 1925
 Teinostoma imperfectum Pilsbry & Olsson, 1945
 Teinostoma incertum Pilsbry & McGinty, 1945
 Teinostoma inconspicuum Thiele, 1925
 Teinostoma invallatum (Carpenter, 1864)
 Teinostoma involutum Hedley, 1902
 Teinostoma jucundum (Melvill, 1904)
 Teinostoma lampetes Pilsbry & Olsson, 1952
 Teinostoma lenticulare (H.C. Lea, 1846)
 Teinostoma lerema Pilsbry & McGinty, 1945
 Teinostoma lirulatum (Carpenter, 1857)
 Teinostoma lituspalmarum Pilsbry & McGinty, 1945
 Teinostoma lucidum A. Adams, 1863
 Teinostoma lunense Rubio, Fernández-Garcés & Rolán, 2011
 † Teinostoma margaritula Deshayes, 1864 
 Teinostoma megacallum Rubio, Fernández-Garcés & Rolán, 2011
 Teinostoma megastoma (C. B. Adams, 1850)
 Teinostoma millepunctatum Pilsbry & Olsson, 1945
 Teinostoma minusculum (Bush, 1897)
 † Teinostoma minutum (Conti, 1864) 
 † Teinostoma mite Deshayes, 1864 
 Teinostoma morlierei Jousseaume, 1872
 Teinostoma multisulcatum Dautzenberg & H. Fischer, 1907
 Teinostoma myrae Pilsbry & Olsson, 1952
 † Teinostoma nanum (Grateloup, 1832) 
 Teinostoma narina Pilsbry & Olsson, 1945
 Teinostoma nesaeum Pilsbry & McGinty, 1945
 † Teinostoma obesum Landau, Ceulemans & Van Dingenen, 2018 
 Teinostoma obtectum Pilsbry & McGinty, 1945
 Teinostoma ochsneri Strong & Hertlein, 1939
 Teinostoma oppletum Hedley, 1898
 Teinostoma pallidulum (Carpenter, 1847)
 Teinostoma panamense Rubio, Rolán & Lee, 2011
 Teinostoma parvicallum Pilsbry & McGinty, 1945
 Teinostoma percarinatum Pilsbry & Olsson, 1945
 Teinostoma perspicuum (A. Adams, 1861)
 Teinostoma politum A. Adams, 1853
 † Teinostoma priscum Deshayes, 1863 
 Teinostoma radiatum A. Adams, 1863
 Teinostoma rarum Pilsbry & Olsson, 1945
 Teinostoma reclusum Dall, 1889
 Teinostoma rhinoceros Jousseaume, 1881
 † Teinostoma rotellaeforme Deshayes, 1864 
 Teinostoma sapiella Dall, 1919
 Teinostoma semistriatum (d'Orbigny, 1842)
 Teinostoma shepstonense Tomlin, 1926
 Teinostoma sibogae Schepman, 1908
 Teinostoma solidum E. A. Smith, 1872
 Teinostoma solidum (Dall, 1889) (This is a secondary homonym of Teinostoma solida [sic] E. A. Smith, 1871, from West Africa. As its generic placement is not final, the name may remain valid if allocated to another genus.)
 Teinostoma soror Pilsbry & Olsson, 1945
 † Teinostoma striatissimum Deshayes, 1864 
 Teinostoma substriatum Carpenter, 1857
 Teinostoma sulcatum (Carpenter, 1857)
 Teinostoma supravallatum (Carpenter, 1864)
 Teinostoma tectispira Pilsbry, 1953
 † Teinostoma trigonostoma Deshayes, 1864 
 Teinostoma tumens (Carpenter, 1857)
 Teinostoma ultimum Pilsbry & Olsson, 1945
 Teinostoma umbilicatum (H. C. Lea, 1843)
 Teinostoma vayssierei Couturier, 1907
 Teinostoma zacae Hertlein & Strong, 1951

Taxa inquirenda
 Teinostoma carpenteri A. Adams, 1861 
 Teinostoma hidalgoana Pilsbry, 1895
 Teinostoma parvum (Stimpson, 1851) (nomen dubium)

Synonyms
 Teinostoma alfredensis Bartsch, 1915: synonym of Teinostoma africanum (E. A. Smith, 1904) (junior synonym)
 Teinostoma azoricum (Dautzenberg & H. Fischer, 1896): synonym of Seamountiella azorica (Dautzenberg & H. Fischer, 1896)
 Teinostoma bartschi Vanatta, 1913: synonym of Solariorbis infracarinatus (Gabb, 1881)
 † Teinostoma calliglyptum Dall, 1903: synonym of  † Anticlimax calliglypta (Dall, 1903) (original combination)
 Teinostoma clavium Pilsbry & McGinty, 1945: synonym of Teinostoma semistriatum (d'Orbigny, 1842)
 Teinostoma cryptospira (A. E. Verrill, 1884): synonym of Teinostoma umbilicatum (H. C. Lea, 1843)
 Teinostoma dalli Dautzenberg, 1912 : synonym of Leucorhynchia punctata (Jousseaume, 1872)
 Teinostoma emmeles Melvill, 1910: synonym of Eunaticina emmeles (Melvill, 1910)
 Teinostoma floridense (Dall, 1927): synonym of Cirsonella floridensis (Dall, 1927)
 Teinostoma funiculus Dall, 1892: synonym of Vitrinella funiculus (Dall, 1892)
 Teinostoma hondurasensis Vanatta, 1913: synonym of Solariorbis hondurasensis (Vanatta, 1913)
 Teinostoma involuta Hedley, 1902: synonym of Teinostoma involutum Hedley, 1902 (incorrect gender agreement of specific epithet)
 Teinostoma millepunctatum Nowell-Usticke, 1969: synonym of Teinostoma ciskae Faber, 1995
 Teinostoma modesta Dall, 1889: synonym of Dillwynella modesta (Dall, 1889)
 † Teinostoma opsitelotus Dall, 1892: synonym of † Vitrinella opsitelotus (Dall, 1892) 
 Teinostoma orbitum Hedley, 1900: synonym of Caperella orbita (Hedley, 1900) (original combination)
 Teinostoma pilsbryi McGinty, 1945: synonym of Anticlimax pilsbryi (McGinty, 1945)
 Teinostoma proboscidea Aguayo, 1949: synonym of Anticlimax proboscidea (Aguayo, 1949)
 Teinostoma punctatum Jousseaume, 1872: synonym of Leucorhynchia punctata (Jousseaume, 1872)
 Teinostoma qualum Hedley, 1899: synonym of Munditiella qualum (Hedley, 1899)
 Teinostoma rotatum Hedley, 1899: synonym of Leucorhynchia rotata (Hedley, 1899) (original combination)
 Teinostoma salvania Dall, 1919: synonym of Vitrinella eshnaurae Bartsch, 1907
 Teinostoma sulcata [sic] : synonym of Pygmaeorota sulcata (A. Adams, 1850)
 Teinostoma schumoi Vanatta, 1913: synonym ofs Solariorbis schumoi (Vanatta, 1913)
 Teinostoma solida E. A. Smith, 1872: synonym of Teinostoma solidum E. A. Smith, 1872 (wrong grammatical agreement of species epithet)
 Teinostoma starkeyae Hedley, 1899: synonym of Starkeyna starkeyae (Hedley, 1899)
 Teinostoma sulcata [sic]: synonym of Pygmaeorota sulcata (A. Adams, 1850): synonym of Circulus sulcatus (A. Adams, 1850) (incorrect gender ending)
 Teinostoma suppressa Dall, 1889: synonym of Cyclostremiscus suppressus (Dall, 1889)
Teinostoma vesta Hedley, 1901: synonym of Vitrinella vesta (Hedley, 1901)  (original combination)

References

 Nomenclator Zoologicus info
 Gofas, S.; Afonso, J.P.; Brandào, M. (Ed.). (S.a.). Conchas e Moluscos de Angola = Coquillages et Mollusques d'Angola. [Shells and molluscs of Angola]. Universidade Agostinho / Elf Aquitaine Angola: Angola. 140 pp.
 Vaught, K.C. (1989). A classification of the living Mollusca. American Malacologists: Melbourne, FL (USA). . XII, 195 pp.
 Gofas, S.; Le Renard, J.; Bouchet, P. (2001). Mollusca, in: Costello, M.J. et al. (Ed.) (2001). European register of marine species: a check-list of the marine species in Europe and a bibliography of guides to their identification. Collection Patrimoines Naturels, 50: pp. 180–213
 Spencer, H.; Marshall. B. (2009). All Mollusca except Opisthobranchia. In: Gordon, D. (Ed.) (2009). New Zealand Inventory of Biodiversity. Volume One: Kingdom Animalia. 584 pp
 Rubio F., Fernández-Garcés R. & Rolán E. (2011) The family Tornidae (Gastropoda, Rissooidea) in the Caribbean and neighboring areas. Iberus 29(2): 1-230.

Teinostomatidae
Gastropod genera
Taxonomy articles created by Polbot